

Paleontologists
 Birth of William Buckland, the polymath who was the first person to scientifically describe a dinosaur.

References

18th century in paleontology
Paleontology